Sheridan William Robin Russell (23 March 1900 – 9 April 1991) was a cellist, medical doctor, and patron of the arts. He was Head Almoner at the National Hospital for Neurology and Neurosurgery and founded the Paintings in Hospitals charity. 

He was the younger son of the professor of singing and the San Carlo and later Boston Opera director Henry Russell and his wife, Nina. Russell was partially of Jewish descent through his parents and of Spanish and Portuguese descent through his mother.

He appeared as a castaway on the BBC Radio programme Desert Island Discs on 4 April 1970.

Russell was known as Britain's first male almoner.

Russell did not speak until he was three years old. At five years of age, he began to learn the cello. As a child in Paris, he was frequently taken to lunch with Claude Debussy. It was Debussy who diagnosed Russell as being partially deaf.

During World War II, Russell worked for British Intelligence in Italy.

He married the social worker and university teacher Katherine Russell on 1 June 1957. Russell died at his home on 9 April 1991 and a book on him Sheridan's Story was published privately by his wife in 1993 and all 1800 copies were sold.

References 

1900 births
Place of birth missing
1991 deaths
Place of death missing
Almoners
British cellists
20th-century British medical doctors
20th-century British musicians
20th-century cellists
British people of Jewish descent
British people of Spanish descent
British people of Portuguese descent